Dark Sermon was an American blackened death metal band from Tampa, Florida signed to EOne Music in North America and Nuclear Blast Records in Europe. The band was formed in 2009 under the name "In Reference to a Sinking Ship" and later changed their name to "Dark Sermon" in 2012. The band's most recent effort, The Oracle, was released on August 21, 2015 worldwide through EOne Music and Nuclear Blast Records. Dark Sermon has toured and played with many metal acts including Aborted, Chimaira, Sepultura, Behemoth and Cattle Decapitation.

History

In Reference To A Sinking Ship (2009-2012)
Dark Sermon was formed in early 2009 in Tampa, Florida as In Reference To A Sinking Ship (IRTASS) by Austin Good, Bryson St. Angelo, Evan Miller, Austin Chandler and Johnny Crowder. As teenagers, the band released a demo in 2009 and their first EP, Aimless, in 2010. Both were received well by many underground blogs and publications such as Duckcore, Total Deathcore, Chugcore, and thelastdisaster. As an unsigned band, they drew national attention to the Tampa scene and shared the stage with bands such as Obscura, Evergreen Terrace, Stick To Your Guns, Norma Jean, and Shai Hulud, as well as playing the 2010 editions of the Summer Slaughter Tour and Vans Warped Tour. This immediate success in the Tampa metal scene led them to their first tours in early 2012 with King Conquer, Forty Winters and Abiotic. The band had a unique blend to their sound, being the only extreme metal act in a scene that was oversaturated with melodic hardcore and metalcore bands. Although they were a favorite in their hometown, the name IRTASS was heavily criticized for being too long and complicated.

Name Change, Signing to eOne Music/Nuclear Blast, In Tongues (2012-2013)

The band changed its name to Dark Sermon in 2012. In an online interview, vocalist Johnny Crowder discussed the band's reasoning for a name change: "There are a lot of reasons why we changed our name. A six-word band name is too much. It's hard to remember, and I feel like people weren't taking us as seriously as they should. Our music and our name didn't match. People would see our name and scoff, but then we'd play and then they'd say, 'Oh, why is that band called that?' I feel like our new name represents our sound much better."

Following their name change, the band toured for the first time as Dark Sermon for several tours with King Conquer, The World We Knew, Sirens and Sailors, and Abiotic. Music videos were shot for two upcoming singles, "In Tongues" and "Hounds" that would eventually make its way to the album. On November 12, 2012, Dark Sermon announced that they signed a worldwide deal with eOne Music and would release their new album the following year.

This was the band's official statement on joining eOne: "We are very proud to announce that we have recently signed with eOne Music & Good Fight Entertainment! We are currently in the studio recording a brand new full length record, which is due to be out in March 2013 via eOne Music! We are extremely humbled to be labelmates with bands such as Chimaira, Hatebreed, Black Label Society, Impending Doom, and most recently, our new friends in Within the Ruins!" The band ended the year with a new name, label support, and a last-minute slot to play Barge to Hell, an extreme metal boat cruise, from December 3–7, 2012 playing with veteran bands such as At The Gates, Exodus, Sepultura, Vital Remains, Soilwork, and more.

The band announced that their debut album In Tongues would be released on March 26, 2013 through eOne Music in North America. They also signed a deal with Nuclear Blast Records to release their record through Europe on April 12, 2013. The band released the first new single off of their upcoming album, "Imperfect Contrition" on March 5, 2013.  With a new album on the way and a couple of big labels behind them, the band began to tour throughout North America in 2013. This touring cycle included their first visits to Canada in March 2013.

The Oracle (2014-2016)

In 2014, the band announced a U.S headlining tour as well as news of a brand new single. They released "Starve," the first single from their to-be-released second album on June 18, 2014. Following this tour, the band took some time off to work on the new album. This was followed by a fall tour with Suffokate, Reformers, Blood of the Martyrs, and Colossus. The band continued to complete their new album for the next few months and were slated for a 2015 release.

Dark Sermon was later announced as a last-minute addition to 70000 Tons of Metal from January 22–26, 2015; a four-day cruise with over 60 bands which featured legendary acts such as Cannibal Corpse, Napalm Death, Venom, Behemoth, Arch Enemy, and more. On March 2, 2015, the band announced that the new album was completed and would be out later that year. This was followed by a couple of announcements for back-to-back tours with Sworn Enemy / Wretched and Aborted / Fit For An Autopsy / Archspire. On May 28, the band announced their new album, The Oracle, would be released on August 21, 2015 through eOne Music.

The band toured and released several singles in support of the new album, The Oracle. The first music video off of The Oracle was filmed for the single "Rat King" and was released on September 8, 2015. Dark Sermon spent the fall on tour supporting Cattle Decapitation throughout North America and released a second music video for the song "The Eyeless Needle."

Following the release of The Oracle, Dark Sermon's touring cycle continued throughout North America well into 2016 in support of major metal acts like Thy Art Is Murder, Rings of Saturn, and Rivers of Nihil. This cycle also included a full US headlining tour with support from Canadian hardcore band Exalt.

Tours

2012
 East Coast tour from February 1 to February 19 with Forty Winters and A Fight For Life. (as IRTASS) 
 Shredded to Pieces tour from April 15 to April 22 with King Conquer, Abiotic and Forty Winters. (as IRTASS)
 Brief run from August 5 to August 11 with The World We Knew and Sirens and Sailors

2013
 The World We Knew farewell tour from February 9 to March 3 with Aegaeon
Metalfest Invasion Tour from April 12 to April 27 with Abiotic
Crown of Phantoms North American tour from July 26 to August 25 with Chimaira, The Browning and Threat Signal.

2014
 Headlining tour from June 1 to June 25 with Kingmaker, Villains (Yüth Forever), and Widow (Darke Complex).
 The Thrill of the Kill tour from September 6 to September 19 with Suffokate, Colossus and Reformers.

2015
 No Mercy No Surrender tour from April 7 to May 1 with Sworn Enemy, Wretched and Hammerfight.
 Spring tour from May 8 to June 7 with Aborted, Fit For An Autopsy, and Archspire.
 The North American Extinction tour from September 15 to October 7 with Cattle Decapitation, King Parrot, and Black Crown Initiate.

2016
 Winter tour from February 17 to March 6 with Rivers of Nihil and Black Fast
 The Coffin Dragger tour from April 6 to May 20 with Thy Art is Murder, Fit For An Autopsy and Rings of Saturn.

Members

Final lineup
 Austin Good  – guitars (2009–2017)
 Neal Minor  – guitars (2011–2017)
 Jordan Jensen – drums (2013–2017)
 Paul Stellmach– bass guitar (2013–2017)
 Johnny Crowder – vocals (2009–2017)

Former members
 Austin Chandler– bass (2009–2013)
 Bryson St. Angelo – drums (2009–2013)
 Evan Miller – guitars (2009–2011)

Discography
Albums
  In Tongues (eOne Music 2013)
  The Oracle (eOne Music 2015)

Videography

References

American deathcore musical groups
Death metal musical groups from Florida
Blackened death metal musical groups
MNRK Music Group artists
Musical groups from Tampa, Florida
2009 establishments in Florida
2017 disestablishments in Florida